The Prussian Formation is a geologic formation in Russia. It holds 90% of the world’s amber supply.

References 

Geology of Russia
Amber